
Year 473 BC was a year of the pre-Julian Roman calendar. At the time, it was known as the Year of the Consulship of Mamercus and Iullus (or, less frequently, year 281 Ab urbe condita). The denomination 473 BC for this year has been used since the early medieval period, when the Anno Domini calendar era became the prevalent method in Europe for naming years.

Events 
 By place 
 China 
 The State of Wu is annexed by the State of Yue.

 Japan 
 The Hikawa Shrine is established in Saitama, Saitama.

Births

Deaths 
 King Fuchai of Wu, the last king of Wu in Zhou Dynasty, China

References